The Sierra del Tontal is a mountain range in the southern part of San Juan Province, Argentina.

The range is in the precordillera area of La Rioja, San Juan and Mendoza, in the Cuyo region. 
It extends south of the Sierra del Tigre, from which it is separated by the valley of the San Juan River.
Its southern foothills are located in Mendoza Province. The city of San Juan is located east of the mountains and the Calingasta valley to the west.

The rocks include greywackes and shales. The fossil remains of plants that probably date to the middle or upper Devonian period are found in the shales.

References
Citations

Sources

Mountain ranges of Argentina
Landforms of San Juan Province, Argentina